Miodówko  is a village in the administrative district of Gmina Stawiguda, within Olsztyn County, Warmian-Masurian Voivodeship, in northern Poland. It is located in Warmia.

The village has a population of 138.

A historical Warmian wayside shrine is located in the village.

References

Villages in Olsztyn County